Laurie Penny (born Laura Barnett, 28 September 1986) is a British journalist and writer. Penny has written articles for publications including The Guardian, The New York Times and Salon. Penny is a contributing editor at the New Statesman and the author of several books on feminism, and they have also written for American television shows including The Haunting of Bly Manor and The Nevers.

Early life and education 
Penny was born in London to two lawyers of Irish, Jewish and Maltese descent, and grew up in Lewes and Brighton.  Penny suffered from anorexia as a teenager and was hospitalised with the condition aged 17. They later recovered from the illness and wrote about the experience from a feminist perspective in their book Unspeakable Things.

Penny attended the independent school Brighton College before studying English at Wadham College, Oxford.

Career 
Penny's blog "Penny Red" was launched in 2007 and was shortlisted for the Orwell Prize for blogging in 2010. Penny went on to become a columnist at The Independent in 2012 and then a columnist and contributing editor for the New Statesman. They are a regular contributor to The Guardian.

In April 2011, they presented the Channel 4 Dispatches programme "Cashing in on Degrees".  and also appeared on Channel 4's satirical current affairs programme 10 O'Clock Live and on BBC Two's Newsnight.

In 2012, Tatler magazine described Penny as one of the top 100 "people who matter". In October 2012, The Daily Telegraph ranked Penny as the 55th most influential left-winger in Britain, describing them as "without doubt the loudest and most controversial female voice on the radical left", and the knowledge networking company Editorial Intelligence awarded Penny its "Twitter Public Personality" award. In 2015 Penny was a Nieman Fellow at Harvard University.

Several of Penny's articles have provoked criticism, including a 2014 article for the New Statesman that argued short hair on women was a "political statement" and a 2015 article defending vandalism of the Monument to the Women of World War II.

Publications 
Penny is the author of seven books including Bitch Doctrine, Unspeakable Things and Everything Belongs to the Future. Penny's book Penny Red: Notes from the New Age of Dissent was shortlisted for the first Bread and Roses Award for Radical Publishing in 2012. Their seventh book, Bitch Doctrine: Essays for Dissenting Adults, was longlisted for the 2018 Orwell Prize.

Screenwriting 
Penny has also written for streaming TV, contributing to episodes of the Netflix show The Haunting of Bly Manor and HBO's The Nevers, and acted as a story editor on Carnival Row.

Personal life 
Penny came out as genderqueer, pansexual and polyamorous in 2015. In 2020, Penny stated a preference for the pronouns they/them; they also use she/her pronouns, although they consider them to be "less accurate".

In December 2020 Penny married in Los Angeles, California.

Penny has stated they have complex post-traumatic stress disorder (CPTSD) and autism.

Awards 
 2010: Orwell Prize for blogging, shortlist
 2012: Bread and Roses Award, shortlist, Penny Red: Notes from the New Age of Dissent
 2014: Red Women of the Year Award, blogger category, shortlist
 2015: William Montalbano Nieman Fellow
 2015: Fellow at the Berkman Centre for Internet and Society at Harvard University
 2017: John W. Campbell Award for Best New Writer, finalist
 2018: American Society of Magazine Editors National Magazine Awards, Columns and Commentary category, finalist, for the columns "The Horizon of Desire", "We’re All Mad Here: Weinstein, Women, and the Language of Lunacy", and "The Unforgiving Minute".

Bibliography 
 Meat Market: Female Flesh Under Capitalism (Zero Books, 2011)
 Penny Red: Notes from the New Age of Dissent (Pluto Press, 2011)
 Discordia: Six Nights in Crisis Athens (Random House, 2012)
 Cybersexism: Sex, Gender and Power on the Internet (Bloomsbury Publishing, 2013)
 Unspeakable Things: Sex, Lies and Revolution (Bloomsbury Publishing, 2014)
 Everything Belongs to the Future (Tor.com, 2016)
 Bitch Doctrine: Essays for Dissenting Adults (Bloomsbury USA, 2017)
 Sexual Revolution : Modern Fascism and the Feminist Fightback (Bloomsbury Publishing PLC, 2022)

References

External links 

 
 

1986 births
Living people
Alumni of Wadham College, Oxford
English atheists
English bloggers
English feminist writers
English feminists
English journalists
English people of Irish descent
English people of Jewish descent
English people of Maltese descent
English socialists
English television writers
People with non-binary gender identities
Marxist feminists
LGBT Jews
Jewish writers
Jewish feminists
People educated at Brighton College
People from Brighton
People from Lewes
People on the autism spectrum
Sex-positive feminists
English socialist feminists
The Guardian people
Writers from London
Non-binary writers
Polyamorous people
Pansexual non-binary people